The list of works by Nora Roberts includes all of the novels and novellas published by author Nora Roberts.  The list is in order by year, and within each year it is in alphabetical order. It includes books published under the names Nora Roberts, J.D. Robb, and Jill March. The complete listing of J.D. Robb novels, in series order, can also be found at in Death.

The years listed below are the years the novels or novellas were originally issued. Many of those novels have been, or will be, reissued, especially in compilations. Such reissues are marked in this list with the year of original publication. To avoid confusion, all of Roberts's new releases include a logo that is a circle with the initials "NR" inside, indicating that the book has never been published before.

Key:

Title (Contents notes) [if any], Series (number in series) [if any], Publisher

1980s
1981
Irish Thoroughbred, Irish Hearts (1 of 3), Silhouette Romance
1982
Blithe Images, Silhouette Romance
 Heart's Victory, Silhouette Special Edition
 Island of Flowers, Silhouette Romance
 Melodies of Love (written as Jill March, "appeared in 'a periodical' which is no longer in business")
 Search For Love, Silhouette
 Song of the West, Silhouette
1983
 From This Day, Silhouette Romance
 Her Mother’s Keeper, Silhouette Romance
 Once More with Feeling, Silhouette Intimate Moments
 Reflections, Reflections & Dreams or the Davidov series (1 of 2), Silhouette Special Edition
 Dance of Dreams, Reflections & Dreams or the Davidov series (2 of 2), Silhouette Special Edition
 This Magic Moment, Silhouette Intimate Moments
 Tonight and Always, Silhouette Intimate Moments
 Untamed, Silhouette
1984
 Endings and Beginnings, Silhouette Intimate Moments
 First Impressions, Silhouette Special Edition
 The Law is a Lady, Silhouette Special Edition
 Less of a Stranger, Silhouette Romance
 A Matter of Choice, Silhouette Intimate Moments
 Opposites Attract, Silhouette Special Edition
 Promise Me Tomorrow, Pocket
 Rules of the Game, Silhouette Intimate Moments
 Storm Warning, Silhouette
 Sullivan’s Woman, Silhouette
1985
 Boundary Lines, Silhouette Intimate Moments
 Dual Image, Silhouette
 Night Moves, Harlequin Intrigue
 Partners, Silhouette Intimate Moments
 Playing the Odds, The MacGregors (1 of 9), Silhouette Special Edition
 Tempting Fate, The MacGregors (2 of 9), Silhouette Special Edition
 All the Possibilities, The MacGregors (3 of 9), Silhouette Special Edition
 One Man's Art, The MacGregors (4 of 9), Silhouette Special Edition
 The Right Path, Silhouette Intimate Moments
 Summer Desserts, Great Chefs (1 of 2), Silhouette Special Edition
1986
Affaire Royale, Cordina's Royal Family (1 of 4), Silhouette
 The Art of Deception, Silhouette Intimate Moments
 Home for Christmas (novella, from Silhouette Christmas Stories anthology), Silhouette
 Lessons Learned, Great Chefs (2 of 2), Silhouette Special Edition
 Second Nature, Celebrity Magazine (1 of 2), Silhouette Special Edition
 Risky Business, Silhouette Intimate Moments
 One Summer, Celebrity Magazine (2 of 2), Silhouette Special Edition
 Treasures Lost, Treasures Found, Silhouette Intimate Moments
 A Will and a Way, Silhouette Special Edition
1987
 Command Performance, Cordina's Royal Family (2 of 4), Silhouette Intimate Moments
 For Now, Forever, The MacGregors (5 of 9), Silhouette Special Edition
 Hot Ice, Bantam
 Mind Over Matter, Silhouette Intimate Moments
 The Playboy Prince, Cordina's Royal Family (3 of 4), Silhouette Intimate Moments
 Sacred Sins, Sacred Sins (1 of 2), Bantam
 Temptation, Silhouette
1988
Brazen Virtue, Sacred Sins (2 of 2), Bantam
 Irish Rose, Irish Hearts (2 of 3), Silhouette Intimate Moments
 The Last Honest Woman, The O'Hurley's (1 of 4), Silhouette Special Edition
 Dance to the Piper, The O'Hurley's (2 of 4), Silhouette Special Edition
 Skin Deep, The O'Hurley's (3 of 4), Silhouette Special Edition
 Local Hero, Silhouette Special Edition
 Name of the Game, Silhouette Intimate Moments
 Rebellion (novella from Forever Mine anthology), The MacGregors (addition to series), Harlequin Historical
1989
Loving Jack, Loving Jack (1 of 3), Silhouette Special Edition
 Best Laid Plans, Loving Jack (2 of 3), Silhouette Special Edition
 Gabriel’s Angel, Silhouette Intimate Moments
 Impulse (novella, from Silhouette Summer Sizzlers anthology), Silhouette
 Lawless, Loving Jack (3 of 3), Harlequin Historical
 Sweet Revenge, Bantam
 Time Was, Time and Again or The Hornblower Bros. (1 of 2), Silhouette Intimate Moments
 The Welcoming, Silhouette Special Edition

1990s
1990
In From the Cold (novella, from Historical Christmas Stories 1990 anthology), The MacGregors (addition to series), Harlequin
 Public Secrets, Bantam
 Taming Natasha, The Stanislaskis or Those Wild Ukrainians (1 of 6), Silhouette Special Edition
 Times Change, Time and Again or The Hornblower Bros. (2 of 2), Silhouette Intimate Moments
 Without a Trace, The O'Hurley's (4 of 4), Silhouette Special Edition
1991
 Courting Catherine, The Calhoun Women (1 of 5), Silhouette Romance
 A Man for Amanda, The Calhoun Women (2 of 5), Silhouette Desire
 For the Love of Lilah, The Calhoun Women (3 of 5), Silhouette Special Edition
 Genuine Lies, Bantam
 Luring a Lady, The Stanislaskis or Those Wild Ukrainians (2 of 6), Silhouette Special Edition
 Night Shift, Night Tales (1 of 5), Silhouette Intimate Moments
 Night Shadow, Night Tales (2 of 5), Silhouette Intimate Moments
 Suzanna’s Surrender, The Calhoun Women (4 of 5), Silhouette Intimate Moments
1992
 Captivated, The Donovan Legacy (1 of 4), Silhouette Special Edition
 Entranced, The Donovan Legacy (2 of 4), Silhouette Special Edition
 Carnal Innocence, Bantam
 Charmed, The Donovan Legacy (3 of 4), Silhouette Special Edition
 Divine Evil, Bantam
 Honest Illusions, Putnam
 Unfinished Business, Silhouette Intimate Moments
 Cordina's Crown Jewel,  Cordina's Royal Family (4 of 4), Silhouette Intimate Moments
1993
 Falling for Rachel, The Stanislaskis or Those Wild Ukrainians (3 of 6), Silhouette Special Edition
 Nightshade, Night Tales (3 of 5), Silhouette Intimate Moments
 Private Scandals, Putnam
1994
All I Want for Christmas (novella, from Jingle Bells, Wedding Bells anthology), Silhouette
 The Best Mistake (novella, from Birds, Bees and Babies '94 anthology), Silhouette
 Born in Fire, The Concannon Sisters or Born in Trilogy (1 of 3), Jove
 Convincing Alex, The Stanislaskis or Those Wild Ukrainians (4 of 6), Silhouette Special Edition
 Hidden Riches, Putnam
 Night Smoke, Night Tales (4 of 5), Silhouette Intimate Moments
1995
Born in Ice, The Concannon Sisters or Born in Trilogy (2 of 3), Jove
 Naked in Death, In Death 1, Berkley
 Glory in Death, In Death 2, Berkley
 The Return of Rafe MacKade, The MacKade Brothers (1 of 4), Silhouette Intimate Moments
 The Pride of Jared MacKade, The MacKade Brothers (2 of 4), Silhouette Special Edition
 True Betrayals, Jove
1996
Born in Shame, The Concannon Sisters or Born in Trilogy (3 of 3), Jove
 The Calhoun Women (compilation: Courting Catherine, A Man for Amanda, For the Love of Lilah, and Suzanna's Surrender (all 1991) ), The Calhoun Women (1-4 of 5), Silhouette
 Daring to Dream, Dream or Templeton House (1 of 3), Jove
 The Heart of Devin MacKade, The MacKade Brothers (3 of 4), Silhouette Intimate Moments
 The Fall of Shane MacKade, The MacKade Brothers (4 of 4), Silhouette Special Edition
 From the Heart (compilation: Tonight and Always (1983), A Matter of Choice (1984), and Endings and Beginnings (1984) ), Jove
 Immortal in Death, In Death 3, Berkley
 Megan’s Mate, The Calhoun Women (5 of 5), Silhouette Intimate Moments
 Montana Sky, Putnam
 Rapture in Death, In Death 4, Berkley
1997
Hidden Star, Stars of Mithra (1 of 3), Silhouette Intimate Moments
 Captive Star, Stars of Mithra (2 of 3), Silhouette Intimate Moments
 Ceremony in Death, In Death 5, Berkley
 Holding the Dream, Dream or Templeton House (2 of 3), Jove
 Finding the Dream, Dream or Templeton House (3 of 3), Jove
 The MacGregor Brides, The MacGregors (6 of 9), Silhouette
 Sanctuary, Putnam
 The Stanislaski Sisters: Natasha and Rachel (compilation: Taming Natasha (1990) and Falling for Rachel (1993) ), The Stanislaskis or Those Wild Ukrainians (1 & 3 of 6), Silhouette
 Vengeance in Death, In Death 6, Berkley
 Waiting for Nick, The Stanislaskis or Those Wild Ukrainians (5 of 6), Silhouette Special Edition
1998
 The Calhoun Women: Catherine and Amanda (compilation: Courting Catherine (1991) and A Man for Amanda (1991) ), The Calhoun Women (1 & 2 of 5), Silhouette
 The Calhoun Women: Lilah and Suzanna (compilation: For the Love of Lilah (1991) and Suzanna's Surrender (1991) ), The Calhoun Women (3 & 4 of 5), unknown
 Holiday in Death, In Death 7, Berkley
 Homeport, Putnam
 The MacGregors: Serena ~ Caine (compilation: Playing the Odds (1985) and Tempting Fate (1985) ), The MacGregors (1 & 2 of 9), Silhouette
 The MacGregor Grooms, The MacGregors (8 of 9), Silhouette
 Midnight in Death (novella, from Silent Night anthology),  In Death 7.5, Jove
 The Reef, Putnam
 Rising Tides, Chesapeake Bay or Quinn Bros. (2 of 4), Jove
 Sea Swept, Chesapeake Bay or Quinn Bros. (1 of 4), Jove
 Secret Star, Stars of Mithra (3 of 3), Silhouette Intimate Moments
 Spellbound (novella, from Once Upon A Castle anthology), Once Upon novellas (1 of 6), Jove
 Three Complete Novels (compilation: Born in Fire (1994), Born in Ice (1995), and Born in Shame (1996) ), The Concannon Sisters or Born in Trilogy (1-3 of 3), Putnam
 The Winning Hand, The MacGregors (7 of 9), Silhouette Special Edition
1999
Conspiracy in Death, In Death 8, Berkley
 The Donovan Legacy (compilation: Captivated, Entranced, and Charmed (all 1992) ), The Donovan Legacy (1-3 of 4), Silhouette
 Enchanted, The Donovan Legacy (4 of 4), Silhouette
 Ever After (novella, from Once Upon A Star anthology), Once Upon novellas (2 of 6), Jove
 Inner Harbor, Chesapeake Bay or Quinn Bros. (3 of 4), Jove
 Jewels of the Sun, Irish Trilogy or Gallaghers of Ardmore (1 of 3), Jove
 Loyalty in Death, In Death 9, Berkley
 The MacGregors: Alan ~ Grant (compilation: All the Possibilities and One Man's Art (both 1985) ), The MacGregors (3 & 4 of 9), Silhouette
 The MacGregors: Daniel ~ Ian (compilation: For Now, Forever (1997) and In from the Cold (1990) ), The MacGregors (5 of 9 and novella), Silhouette
 The Perfect Neighbor, The MacGregors (9 of 9), Silhouette Special Edition
 River’s End, Putnam
 Three Complete Novels (compilation: Daring to Dream (1996), Holding the Dream (1997), and Finding the Dream (1997) ), Dream or Templeton House (1-3 of 3), Putnam

2000s
2000
Carolina Moon, Putnam
 "Christmas in Ardmore" (short story), Irish Trilogy or Gallaghers of Ardmore (addition to series), Jove
 "Christmas with the Quinns” (short story), Chesapeake Bay or Quinn Bros. (addition to series), Jove
 Heart of the Sea, Irish Trilogy or Gallaghers of Ardmore (3 of 3), Jove
 In Dreams (novella, from Once Upon A Dream anthology),  Once Upon novellas (3 of 6), Jove
 Irish Hearts [duplicated title - see 2007] (compilation: Irish Thoroughbred (1981) & Irish Rose (1988)), Irish Hearts (1 & 2 of 3), Silhouette
 Irish Rebel, Irish Hearts (3 of 3), Silhouette Special Edition
 Judgment in Death, In Death 11, Berkley
 Night Shield, Night Tales (5 of 5), Silhouette Intimate Moments
 Night Tales (compilation: Night Shift (1991), Night Shadow (1991), Nightshade (1993), and Night Smoke (1994) ), Night Tales (1-4 of 5), Silhouette
 The Stanislaski Brothers: Mikhail and Alex (compilation: Luring a Lady (1991) and Convincing Alex (1994) ), The Stanislaskis or Those Wild Ukrainians (2 & 4 of 6), Silhouette
 Tears of the Moon, Irish Trilogy or Gallaghers of Ardmore(2 of 3), Jove
 Three Complete Novels (compilation: Honest Illusions (1992), Private Scandals (1993), and Hidden Riches (1994) ), Putnam
 Witness in Death, In Death 10, Berkley
2001
Betrayal in Death, In Death 12, Berkley
 Chapter 2 (novella(?), from Naked Came the Phoenix anthology), St. Martin's Minotaur
 Considering Kate, The Stanislaskis or Those Wild Ukrainians (6 of 6), Silhouette Special Edition
 Dance Upon the Air, Three Sisters Island (1 of 3), Jove
 Heaven and Earth, Three Sisters Island (2 of 3), Jove
 Interlude in Death (novella(?), from Out of this World anthology), In Death 12.5, Jove
 Midnight Bayou, Putnam
 Reflections and Dreams (compilation: Reflections and Dance of Dreams (both 1983) ), Reflections and Dreams or the Davidov series (1 & 2 of 2), Silhouette
 Seduction in Death, In Death 13, Berkley
 Three Complete Novels (compilation: True Betrayals (1996), Montana Sky (1996), and Sanctuary (1997) ), Putnam
 Time and Again (compilation: Time Was (1989) and Times Change (1990) ), Time and Again or The Hornblower Bros. (1 & 2 of 2), Silhouette
 The Villa, Jove
 Winter Rose (novella, from Once Upon A Rose anthology), Once Upon novellas (4 of 6), Jove
2002
Chesapeake Blue, Chesapeake Bay or Quinn Bros. (4 of 4), Putnam
 Cordina’s Crown Jewel (1992), Cordina's Royal Family (4 of 4), Silhouette Special Edition
 Cordina's Royal Family (compilation: Affaire Royale (1986), Command Performance (1987), and The Playboy Prince (1987) ), Cordina's Royal Family (1-3 of 4), Silhouette
 Dangerous (compilation: Risky Business (1986), Storm Warning (1984), and The Welcome (?) ), Silhouette
 Face the Fire, Three Sisters Island (3 of 3), Jove
 Going Home (compilation: Mind Over Matter (1987), Unfinished Business (1992), and Island of Flowers (1982) ), Silhouette
 A Little Magic (compilation: Spellbound (1998), Ever After (1999), and In Dreams (2000) ), Once Upon novellas (1-3 of 6), Berkley
 Purity in Death, In Death 15, Berkley
 Reunion in Death, In Death 14, Berkley
 Summer Pleasures (compilation: One Summer and Second Nature (both 1986) ), Celebrity magazine (1 & 2 of 2), Silhouette
 Table for Two (compilation: Summer Desserts (1985) and Lessons Learned (1986) ), Great Chefs (1 & 2 of 2), Silhouette
 Three Fates, Putnam
 A World Apart (novella, from Once Upon a Kiss anthology), Once Upon novellas (5 of 6), Jove
2003
Birthright, Putnam
 Engaging the Enemy (compilation: A Will and A Way (1986) and Boundary Lines (1985) ), Silhouette
 Imitation in Death, In Death 17, Berkley
 Irish Born (compilation: Born in Fire (1984), Born in Ice (1985), and Born in Shame (1986); compare Three Complete Novels (1998) ), The Concannon Sisters or Born in Trilogy (1-3 of 3), Berkley
 Key of Knowledge, Key Trilogy (2 of 3), Jove
 Key of Light, Key Trilogy (1 of 3), Jove
 Love by Design (compilation: Loving Jack, Best Laid Plans, and Lawless (all 1989) ), Loving Jack (1-3 of 3), Silhouette
 Mysterious (compilation: Search for Love (1982), This Magic Moment (1983), and The Right Path (1985) ), Berkley
 Portrait in Death, In Death 16, Berkley
 Remember When (original compilation: "Big Jack" (Robb) and "Hot Rocks" (Roberts); reissued independently in 2010 ), In Death 17.5, Putnam
 Suspicious (compilation: Partners (1985), The Art of Deception (1986), and Night Moves (1985) ), Silhouette
 Truly, Madly Manhattan (compilation: Dual Image (1985) and Local Hero (1988) ), Silhouette
 Two of a Kind (compilation: Impulse (1989) and The Best Mistake (1994) ), Silhouette
 The Witching Hour (novella, from Once Upon a Midnight anthology),  Once Upon novellas (6 of 6), Jove
2004
Blue Dahlia, In the Garden (1 of 3), Jove
 Born O'Hurley (compilation: The Last Honest Woman and Dance to the Piper (both 1988) ), The O'Hurleys (1 & 2 of 4), Silhouette
 Charmed & Enchanted (compilation: Charmed (1992) and Enchanted (1999) ), The Donovan Legacy (3 & 4 of 4), Silhouette
 Divided in Death, In Death 18, Putnam
 The Gift (compilation: Home for Christmas (1986) and All I Want for Christmas (1994) ), Silhouette
 Key of Valor, Key Trilogy (3 of 3), Jove
 A Little Fate (compilation: Winter Rose (2001), A World Apart (2002) and The Witching Hour (2003) ), Once Upon novellas (4-6 of 6), Jove
 Lovers & Dreamers (compilation: Daring to Dream (1996), Holding the Dream (1997), and Finding the Dream (1997); original compilation 1999 ), Dream or Templeton House (1-3 of 3), Penguin
 The MacKade Brothers: Devin and Shane (compilation: The Heart of Devin MacKade and The Fall of Shane MacKade (both 1996) ), The MacKade Brothers (3 & 4 of 4), Silhouette
 The MacKade Brothers: Rafe and Jared (compilation: The Return of Rafe MacKade and The Pride of Jared MacKade (both 1995) ), The MacKade Brothers (1 & 2 of 4), Silhouette
 Northern Lights, Putnam
 Reunion (compilation: Once More with Feeling (1983) and Treasures Lost, Treasures Found (1986) ), Silhouette
 Visions in Death, In Death 19, Putnam
 Winner Takes All (compilation: Rules of the Game (1984) and The Name of the Game (?, 1988) ), Silhouette
 With Open Arms (compilation: Song of the West (1982) and Her Mother's Keeper (1983) ), Silhouette
 Wolf Moon (novella, from Moon Shadows anthology), Jove
2005
Black Rose, In the Garden (2 of 3), Jove
 Blue Smoke, Putnam
 The Calhouns: Catherine, Amanda, & Lilah (compilation: Courting Catherine, A Man for Amanda, and For the Love of Lilah (all 1991) ), The Calhoun Women (1-3 of 5), Silhouette
 The Calhouns: Suzanna and Megan (compilation: Suzanna's Surrender (1991) and Megan's Mate (1996)), The Calhoun Women (4 & 5 of 5), Silhouette
 Night Tales [blue] (compilation: Night Shift and Night Shadow (both 1991) ), Night Tales (1 & 2 of 5), Silhouette
 Night Tales [green] (compilation: Nightshade (1993) and Night Smoke (1994) ), Night Tales (3 & 4 of 5), Silhouette
 Night Tales [pink] (compilation: Night Shield (2000) and Night Moves (1985) ), Night Tales (5 of 5 & non-series), Silhouette
 O'Hurley's Return (compilation: Skin Deep (1988) and Without a Trace (1990) ), The O'Hurleys (3 & 4 of 4), Silhouette
 Origin in Death, In Death 21, Berkley
 Red Lily, In the Garden (3 of 3), Jove
 Rules of Play (compilation: Opposites Attract (1984) and The Heart's Victory (?, 1982) ), Silhouette
 Spellbound (1988), Once Upon novellas (1 of 6), Jove
 Survivor in Death, In Death 20, Berkley
2006
Angels Fall, Jove
 "Haunted in Death" (short story, from Bump in the Night anthology), In Death 22.5, Jove
 Born in Death, In Death 23, Berkley
 Cordina's Royal Family: Bennett & Camilla (compilation: The Playboy Prince (1987) and Cordina's Crown Jewel (1992) ), Cordina's Royal Family (3 & 4 of 4), Silhouette
 Cordina's Royal Family: Gabriella & Alexander (compilation: Affaire Royale (1986) and Command Performance (1987) ), Cordina's Royal Family (1 & 2 of 4), Silhouette
 Morrigan's Cross, The Circle Trilogy (1 of 3), Jove
 Dream Makers (compilation: Untamed (1983) and Less of a Stranger (1984) ), Silhouette Special Releases
 Memory in Death, In Death 22, Berkley
 Dance of the Gods, The Circle Trilogy (2 of 3), Jove
 The Quinn Brothers: Cam & Ethan (compilation: Sea Swept and Rising Tides (both 1998) ), Chesapeake Bay or Quinn Bros. (1 & 2 of 4), Berkley
 The Quinn Legacy: Phillip & Seth (compilation: Inner Harbor (1999) and Chesapeake Blue (2002) ), Chesapeake Bay or Quinn Bros. (3 & 4 of 4), Berkley
 Valley of Silence, The Circle Trilogy (3 of 3), Jove
 Innocent in Death, In Death 24, Berkley
2007
Blood Brothers, Sign of Seven trilogy (1 of 3), Jove
 Creation in Death, In Death 25, Berkley
 "Eternity in Death" (short story, from Dead of Night anthology),  In Death 24.5, Jove
 High Noon, Putnam 
 Irish Dreams (compilation: Irish Rebel (2000) and Sullivan's Woman (1984) ), Irish Hearts ?, Silhouette Special Releases
 Irish Hearts [duplicated title; see 2000], (compilation: Irish Thoroughbred (1981) and Irish Rose (1988) ), Irish Hearts (1 & 2 of 3), Silhouette Special Releases
 Stars (compilation: Hidden Star (1997) and Captive Star (1997) ), Stars of Mithra (1 & 2 of 3), Silhouette
 The MacGregors: Robert ~ Cybil (compilation: The Winning Hand (1998) and The Perfect Neighbor (1999) ), The MacGregors (7 & 9 of 9), Silhouette
2008
 First Impressions (compilation: "First Impressions" (1984) and "Blithe Images" (1982) ), Silhouette
 The Hollow, Sign of Seven trilogy (2 of 3), Jove
 The Pagan Stone, Sign of Seven trilogy (3 of 3), Jove
 "Ritual in Death" (short story, from Suite 606 anthology), In Death 27.5, Berkley
 Salvation in Death, In Death 27, Putnam Adult
 Strangers in Death, In Death 26, Putnam Adult
 Three in Death (compilation: "Interlude in Death" (2001), "Midnight in Death" (1998), and "Haunted in Death" (2006) ), In Death, Jove (January 2008)
 Treasures (compilation: "Secret Star" (1998) and "Treasures Lost, Treasures Found" (1986) ), Silhouette
 Tribute, Putnam Adult
2009
Bed of Roses, The Bride Quartet (2 of 4), Berkley Trade
Black Hills, Putnam Adult
Kindred in Death, In Death 29, Putnam Adult
 The Law of Love (compilation: "Lawless" (1989) and "The Law is a Lady" (1984) ), Silhouette (May 2009)
'"Missing in Death" (short story, in The Lost anthology), In Death 29.5, Jove
Promises in Death, In Death 28, Putnam Adult 
Vision In White, The Bride Quartet (1 of 4), Berkley Trade
 Windfall (compilation: "Impulse" (1989) and "Temptation" (1984) ), Silhouette
 Worth the Risk (compilation: "Partners" (1985) and "The Art of Deception" (1986) ), Silhouette

2010s
2010
Fantasy in Death, In Death 30, Putnam Adult (February 2010)
Hot Rocks, (independent reissue from 2003 original compilation "Remember When"), Jove (February 2010)
Big Jack, (independent reissue from 2003 original compilation "Remember When"), In Death 17.5, Berkley (March 2010)
Savor the Moment, The Bride Quartet (3 of 4), Berkley Trade (May 2010)
The Search, Putnam Adult (July 2010)
Indulgence in Death, In Death 31, Putnam Adult (November 2010)
"Possession in Death" (short story in The Other Side anthology), In Death 31.5, Jove (November 2010)
Happy Ever After, The Bride Quartet (4 of 4), Berkley Trade (November 2010)
 Secrets and Sunsets, (compilation: "Risky Business" (1986) and "Mind Over Matter" (1987) ), Silhouette (May 2010)
2011
Treachery in Death, In Death 32, Putnam Adult (February 2011)
Chasing Fire, Putnam Adult (April 2011)
Time of Death (compilation: "Eternity in Death" (2007), "Ritual in Death" (2008), "Missing in Death" (2009)), In Death, Berkley Trade (June 2011)
New York to Dallas, In Death 33, Putnam Adult (September 2011)
"Chaos in Death", (short story in The Unquiet anthology), In Death 33.5, Jove (September 2011)
The Next Always, Inn Boonsboro Trilogy (1 of 3), Berkley Trade (November 2011)
Chesapeake Bay Saga, e-book (compilation: "Sea Swept", "Rising Tide", "Inner Harbor", "Chesapeake Blue") Penguin Publishing (2011)
Dream Trilogy, e-book (compilation: "Daring to Dream", "Holding the Dream", "Finding the Dream") Penguin Publishing (2011)
Key Trilogy, e-book (compilation: "Key of Light", "Key of Knowledge", "Key of Valor") Penguin Publishing (2011)
The Novels of Nora Roberts Volume 1, e-book (compilation: "Honest Illustions", "Hidden Riches", "True Betrayals", "Montana Sky") Jove Books (2011)
The Novels of Nora Roberts Volume 2, e-book (compilation: "Sanctuary", "Homeport", "The Reef", "Carolina Moon") Penguin Publishing (2011)
The Novels of Nora Roberts Volume 3, e-book (compilation: "The Villa", "Midnight Bayou", "Three Fates", "Birthright", "Northern Lights") Penguin Publishing (2011)
2012
Celebrity In Death, In Death 34, Putnam Adult (February 2012)
The Witness, Putnam Adult (April 2012)
The Last Boyfriend, Inn Boonsboro Trilogy (2 of 3), Berkley Trade (May 2012)
Delusion in Death, In Death 35, Putnam Adult (September 2012)
The Perfect Hope, Inn Boonsboro Trilogy (3 of 3), Berkley Trade (November 2012)
2013
Calculated In Death, In Death 36, Putnam Adult (February 2013)
Whiskey Beach, Putnam Adult (April 2013)
Thankless in Death, In Death 37, Putnam Adult (September 2013)
"Taken in Death", (short story in Mirror, Mirror anthology), In Death 37.5, Jove (October 2013)
Dark Witch, Cousins O'Dwyer Trilogy (1 of 3), Berkley Trade (November 2013)
Irish Legacy Trilogy Collection, e-book, Penguin Publishing, (compilation: "Irish Thoroughbred", "Irish Rose", "Irish Rebel") (2013)
2014
Concealed in Death, In Death 38, Putnam Adult (February 2014)
Shadow Spell, Cousins O'Dwyer Trilogy (2 of 3), Berkley Trade (March 2014)
The Collector, Putnam Adult (April 2014)
Blood Magick, Cousins O'Dwyer Trilogy (3 of 3), Berkley Trade (November 2014)
Festive in Death, In Death 39, Putnam Adult (September 2014)
2015
Obsession in Death, In Death 40, Putnam Adult (February 2015)
The Liar, Putnam Adult (April 2015)
Devoted in Death, In Death 41, Putnam Adult (September 2015)
Stars of Fortune, Guardians Trilogy (1 of 3), Putnam Adult (November 2015)
2016
Brotherhood in Death, In Death 42, Putnam Adult (February 2016)
The Obsession, Putnam Adult (April 2016)
Bay of Sighs, Guardians Trilogy (2 of 3), Putnam Adult (June 2016)
Apprentice in Death, In Death 43, Putnam Adult (September 2016)
Island of Glass, Guardians Trilogy (3 of 3), Putnam Adult (December 2016)
2017
Echoes in Death, In Death 44, St. Martin's Press (February 2017)
Come Sundown, St. Martin's Press (June 2017)
Secrets in Death, In Death 45, St. Martin's Press (September 2017)
Year One, Chronicles of the One 1, St. Martin's Press (December 2017)
2018
Dark in Death, In Death 46, St. Martin's Press (January 2018)
Shelter in Place, St. Martin's Press (May 2018)
Leverage in Death, In Death 47, St. Martin's Press (September 2018)
Of Blood & Bone, Chronicles of the One 2, St. Martin's Press (December 2018)
2019
Connections in Death, In Death 48, St. Martin's Press (February 2019)
Under Currents, St. Martin's Press (July 2019)
Vendetta in Death, In Death 49, St. Martin's Press (September 2019)
The Rise of Magicks, Chronicles of the One 3, St. Martin's Press (December 2019)

2020s
2020
Golden in Death, In Death 50, St. Martin's Press (February 2020)
Hideaway, St. Martin's Press (July 2020)
Shadows in Death, In Death 51, St. Martin's Press (September 2020)
The Awakening, The Dragon Heart Legacy 1, St. Martin's Press (November 2020)
2021
Faithless in Death, In Death 52, St. Martin's Press (February 2021)
Legacy, St. Martin's Press (May 2021)
Forgotten in Death, In Death 53, St. Martin's Press (September 2021)
The Becoming, The Dragon Heart Legacy 2, St. Martin's Press (November 2021)
2022
Abandoned in Death, In Death 54, St. Martin's Press (February 2022)
Nightwork, St. Martin's Press (May 2022)
Desperation in Death, In Death 55, St. Martin's Press (September 2022)
The Choice, The Dragon Heart Legacy, St. Martin's Press (November 2022)

References

External links
 Nora Roberts Official site
  All Romance Writers – Nora Roberts
 

Bibliographies by writer
Bibliographies of American writers
Romantic fiction bibliographies